Jimmy Black (born November 20, 1960) is an American former college basketball player and assistant coach.  He was the starting point guard and a captain of the 1981–82 national champion North Carolina Tar Heels men's basketball team.

College career
Largely attributable to his quickness, Black led his team in steals and was considered the top defender on his team.  He served as his team's quarterback and had innate court sense.

Black played in the NCAA Tournament all four years at UNC.  As the playmaker on the 1981–82 championship team, he was responsible for directing the ball to teammates James Worthy, Sam Perkins and freshman swingman Michael Jordan.  Black had a close relationship with coach Dean Smith.

Black's mother died during his sophomore season at UNC.

1981–82 season
Along with the likes of Dale Ellis, Patrick Ewing, and Clark Kellogg, Black was among 22 Honorable Mentions for the 1982 UPI (United Press International) All-America Team.  Black was selected to play in the Pizza Hut East-West All-Star Classic in Las Vegas on April 3, 1982, along with such contemporaries as Chuck Nevitt and Louisville's Derek Smith.

Prior to the 1982 tournament, Black called a special team meeting, a sort of pep rally, to pump up the team, focusing on Dean Smith's six Final Four appearances without a title.  During the tournament, Black was named to the East Regional All-Star Team with per game averages of 11.3 points on 88% shooting from the field to go with 6.7 assists in three games.

In the national semifinal, Black guarded the University of Houston's Rob Williams so well that he did not score a field goal (0–8).

In the national championship game, Black had 4 points, 3 rebounds, 7 assists and a steal in 38 minutes, including the pass to Michael Jordan for the game-winning shot.

College statistics

|-
|style="text-align:left;"|1978–79
|style="text-align:left;"|North Carolina
|29|| || ||.479||—||.621||.7||1.3||0.4||0.0||2.2
|-
|style="text-align:left;"|1979–80
|style="text-align:left;"|North Carolina
|27|| || ||.451||—||.677||.6||3.1||1.6||0.3||5.0
|-
|style="text-align:left;"|1980–81
|style="text-align:left;"|North Carolina
|37|| || ||.533||—||.788||1.5||5.1||1.7||0.0||7.3
|-
|style="text-align:left;"|1981–82
|style="text-align:left;"|North Carolina
|34|| || ||.513||—||.738||1.7||6.3||1.7||0.2||7.6
|-
| align="left" | Career
| align="left" |
|127|| ||22.8||.504||—||.734||1.2||4.1||1.4||0.1||5.7
|}

1982 tournament log

After college
Black was the 59th pick in the 1982 NBA Draft, but he did not play in the NBA.  He did sign waivers with the New Jersey Nets, but was waived on October 25, 1982 near the final cut for the team.

After his playing days, Black worked as a graduate assistant at UNC in the 1983–84 season, and then as an assistant coach at several colleges: Saint Joseph's, South Carolina and Notre Dame.  In 1995, Black resigned from his position at Notre Dame and was replaced by Parker Laketa.

Personal life
In 1995, Black was arrested on a misdemeanor domestic violence charge for purportedly striking his fiancée on the leg on December 13, 1994.  This followed previous incidents, including an October 1994 police report in which Black's fiancée was treated at a hospital for a black eye and other injuries.

References

1960 births
Living people
American men's basketball players
Basketball players from New York City
Cardinal Hayes High School alumni
New Jersey Nets draft picks
North Carolina Tar Heels men's basketball players
Notre Dame Fighting Irish men's basketball coaches
Point guards
Saint Joseph's Hawks men's basketball coaches
South Carolina Gamecocks men's basketball coaches
Sportspeople from the Bronx